Konchiravila is a small settlement that lies near Manacaud in Thiruvananthapuram, India. It is around 3 km from East Fort and can be reached by local buses.

It has the  Konchiravila Devi Temple, a shrine dedicated to the Hindu goddess Durga. The annual Pongal festival celebrated here attracts many  devotees from far and near.

Attukal Bhagavathy Temple is situated nearby. Government Homeo Medical College, on the banks of the Killiyar. 
Thiruvananthapuram Central Railway Station (4 km) and Trivandrum International Airport are the nearest railhead and airport respectively.D

References

Suburbs of Thiruvananthapuram
Cities and towns in Thiruvananthapuram district